Miroslava is a commune in Iași County, Western Moldavia, Romania, part of the Iași metropolitan area. It is composed of thirteen villages: Balciu, Brătuleni, Ciurbești, Cornești, Dancaș, Găureni, Horpaz, Miroslava, Proselnici, Uricani, Valea Adâncă, Valea Ursului and Vorovești.

Uricani transmitter 
At Uricani, there is a mediumwave transmitter, which transmits on 1053 kHz with a power of 1000 kW. It is one of the most powerful transmitters in Romania and uses two guyed masts insulated against ground with a height of 165 metres as antenna.

Sport
CS Știința Miroslava is based in the commune.

Natives
Dimitrie Anghel

References

Communes in Iași County
Localities in Western Moldavia